The 2013 Party Rock Open was a professional tennis tournament played on outdoor hard courts. It was the fifth edition of the tournament which was part of the 2013 ITF Women's Circuit, offering a total of $50,000 in prize money. It took place in Las Vegas, United States, on September 23–29, 2013.

WTA entrants

Seeds 

 1 Rankings as of September 16, 2013

Other entrants 
The following players received wildcards into the singles main draw:
  Julia Boserup
  Elizabeth Lumpkin
  Alexandra Stevenson
  Allie Will

The following players received entry from the qualifying draw:
  Jacqueline Cako
  Allie Kiick
  Sanaz Marand
  Asia Muhammad

The following player received entry by a Junior Exempt:
  Taylor Townsend

Champions

Singles 

  Melanie Oudin def.  Coco Vandeweghe 5–7, 6–3, 6–3

Doubles 

  Tamira Paszek /  Coco Vandeweghe def.  Denise Muresan /  Caitlin Whoriskey 6–4, 6–2

External links 
 2013 Party Rock Open at ITFtennis.com
 Official website

 
2013 ITF Women's Circuit
2013 in American tennis
2013
2013 in sports in Nevada
September 2013 sports events in the United States